Knollenberg is a German surname.

Origin
The name may originate from Knollenberg, Württemberg, and can ultimately be derived from knolle (meaning bulb, tuber) and berg (meaning mountain, hill).

Prevalence
The surname is not very common in modern Germany, where the highest level of prevalence is in Vechta. The surname is more common in the United States.

Notable people
Notable people with this surname include:

 Friedrich Knollenberg (1878-1950), German politician (de)
 Joe Knollenberg (1933-2018), American politician
 Marty Knollenberg (born 1963), American politician
 Mary Knollenberg (1904-1992), American sculptor

References

German-language surnames